Oleksiy Tsybko (19 March 1967 – 31 March 2022) was a Ukrainian rugby union international for the Ukraine national rugby union team from 1991 to 2003 who was killed during the retaking of Bucha from Russian forces.

Biography
Tsybko was rugby union player, who made forty appearances for the Ukraine national team; some as captain. From 2005 to 2007 he was President of the Union and he founded a rugby club in Smila which has 300 junior members. A former mayor of Smila, he joined the Ukraine military forces to defend the Crimea from Russian forces in 2014 and again in 2022. He lost his life in March 2022 during the Russian invasion of Bucha. He was buried at Baikove Cemetery in Kyiv.

References

1967 births
2022 deaths
People from Cherkasy Oblast
Rugby union executives
Ukrainian rugby union players
21st-century Ukrainian politicians
Mayors of places in Ukraine
Deaths by firearm in Ukraine
People killed in the 2022 Russian invasion of Ukraine
Civilians killed in the Russian invasion of Ukraine
Burials at Baikove Cemetery